Don Gross may refer to:

Don Gross (baseball) (1931–2017), pitcher for Cincinnati and Pittsburgh
Don Gross (footballer) (born 1947), former VFL footballer for Essendon